Alistair Burns is an English male curler and curling coach.

At the national level, he is a six-time English men's champion curler (1990, 1991, 1992, 1993, 1994, 1995).

Teams

Record as a coach of national teams

Personal life
As of 1996, he was living in south Manchester and was employed as a financial consultant.

References

External links

Living people
English male curlers
English curling champions
English curling coaches
1960s births
English people of Scottish descent
Sportspeople from Manchester